Caesars Windsor in Windsor, Ontario, Canada is one of four casinos in the Detroit–Windsor area and was opened in 1994 on the waterfront of the Detroit River. Owned by the Government of Ontario (through the Ontario Lottery and Gaming Corporation), it is operated by Caesars Entertainment. Both the original Casino Windsor and 2008 expansion were designed by WZMH Architects. 

The casino overlooks the Detroit skyline from the waterfront, and is near the Canadian end of the Detroit-Windsor Tunnel. The creation of this casino was a leading factor in the Michigan legislature authorizing the legalization of casino gambling in Detroit in the early 21st century.

The "Forum" hotel tower stands at 23 stories tall and opened in 1998. The "Augustus" tower stands at 27 stories and opened in 2008. Caesars Windsor attracts about six million visitors annually, from Ontario, Canada; and Michigan, Ohio, Indiana, Illinois and other states in the Midwestern United States. Since 1999, its main competitors are the American MGM Grand Detroit, MotorCity Casino, and Hollywood Casino located across the river in Detroit.

History
In 1993, the Ontario government selected a joint venture of Caesars World, Circus Circus Enterprises, and Hilton Hotels to build and operate a province-owned casino.

Casino Windsor opened in a temporary location in May 1994 as Ontario's first casino. The former Art Gallery of Windsor, located on Riverside Drive, was refitted to house the interim casino. The casino attracted record numbers of customers, millions annually from the U.S. and Canada. Line-ups wrapped around the building. In response, the Ontario Lottery and Gaming Corporation announced it would bring a riverboat casino to the riverfront. The Northern Belle was located at the foot of Ouellette Avenue on the Detroit River. It was open from December 1995 to July 1998.

During this time, the permanent casino was under construction on the former Windsor Market site, a few blocks east of the temporary casino. It opened on July 29, 1998, with a grand opening celebration with a James Bond 007 theme. Daisy Fuentes and Regis Philbin were among the stars that attended. The new site included a waterfall and tropical entrance, hotel, five restaurants, gift shops, and an entertainment lounge.

In February 2005, representatives from the Ontario Government, the Ontario Lottery and Gaming Corporation, and the executive team announced a $400 million expansion project. It was completed in June 2008. It added a convention centre, a 5,000-seat entertainment centre, and a 27-story hotel tower. 

Effective May 31, 2006, Casino Windsor became one of the first smoke-free commercial casinos in North America. It complied with the Smoke Free Ontario Act, banning smoking from all enclosed workplaces and public places.

Renovations were undertaken at the original facility, adding bars, a large buffet, and repositioning many of the slots and table games. The official relaunch took place on June 19, 2008.

Caesars Windsor closed from January 5 to 26, 2022, because of the COVID-19 pandemic restrictions reported in the Ontario government’s Step Two. In a media, Caesars Windsor management announced that it is temporarily closing the doors and that during the period of closure, all restaurant bookings, concerts, and other events will be canceled.

Management
The casino is publicly owned by the Ontario Lottery and Gaming Corporation; a large portion of the profits are returned to the provincial government.

In December 2006, Harrah's announced that it would change the name of the casino to Caesars Windsor. At the same time, the operators began construction of a new 27-story hotel (the "Augustus Tower".

The operators intended to make the casino more attractive to U.S. gamblers. Before the September 11 attacks by terrorists in 2001 in the United States, Casino Windsor was the most popular casino in the Detroit market. Its customer base declined following increased border security by the US, a reduction in the exchange rate gap between Canadian and US currencies, a labour strike that closed the casino for a month in 2004, and the increasing popularity of the three Detroit properties. It may also have been affected by a provincial smoking ban, but Michigan and the US have also restricted public smoking since then.

The changes in the early 2000s were an effort to make Caesars Windsor a destination resort for tourists, and to reward clients of the Caesars brand, a high-end name in gaming. Caesars Windsor reopened on June 19, 2008, and featured American musician Billy Joel, who performed at the relaunch ceremonies to an invitation-only crowd.

The hotel effectively closed on April 6, 2018, due to ongoing workers' strikes. These had resulted in reservation and concert cancellations.  The strike concluded with a ratification vote on June 4, 2018. Caesars Windsor re-opened on June 7, 2018.

Business climate

In the late 1990s, the US-Canadian currency exchange rate had given people from the United States an economic incentive to gamble at Caesars Windsor. Numerous U.S. gamblers crossed the border in Casino Windsor's boom years of the late 1990s. The Canadian dollar was trading below the sixty-five-cent mark compared to the U.S. dollar in the late 1990s. US visitors had incentive to gamble in Windsor, as well as spend in the city's hotels and hospitality establishments. 

The rebounding of the Canadian dollar, which broke the ninety-cent mark in 2006, has been linked to the higher price of oil, since Canada is an oil exporting nation. It negatively affected the casino and the Windsor tourist trade. But, because the Canadian government does not tax gambling winnings, the casino has promoted this to attract clientele from the United States.

In 2007, the Canadian dollar eclipsed and exceeded the U.S. dollar by several cents, which contributed to the decline of the Windsor, Ontario hospitality sector. In addition, the casino must compete with three Detroit casino resorts, which opened across the river in 1999. The positive exchange rate for Canadians in the US has drawn them across the border to shop and gamble.

See also
List of Caesars Entertainment properties 
 List of casinos in Canada
 Harrah's Entertainment
 Caesars Palace

Notes

External links

 Caesars Windsor
 Casino Windsor at Emporis.com
 Casino Windsor Hotel Tower II "Augustus" at Emporis.com
 SkyscraperPage.com's Profile on Casino Windsor

1998 establishments in Ontario
Casinos in Ontario
Skyscrapers in Windsor, Ontario
Hotels in Ontario
Tourist attractions in Windsor, Ontario
Economy of Windsor, Ontario
Caesars Entertainment
Casino hotels
Skyscraper hotels in Canada